Daniel E. O'Day (died 1953) was an American football player and coach. He served as a player-coach at Georgetown University in Washington, D.C. in 1888. O'Day was the starting quarterback for the Hoyas in 1887 and 1888.

References

External links
 

Year of birth missing
1953 deaths
19th-century players of American football
American football quarterbacks
Player-coaches
Georgetown Hoyas football coaches
Georgetown Hoyas football players